John Kelby was the member of Parliament for Great Grimsby in 1393, 1397, 1402 and 1406, and the bailiff of that town for 1393–94.

References 

English MPs 1393
Year of birth missing
Year of death missing
Members of the Parliament of England for Great Grimsby
English MPs September 1397
English MPs 1402
English MPs 1406